Ubehebe Crater is a large volcanic crater of the Ubehebe Craters volcanic field in the northern half of Death Valley, in Death Valley National Park, California, United States.

Geography
Ubehebe Crater (pronounced YOO-bee-HEE-bee) is located at the north tip of the Cottonwood Mountains. The age of the crater is estimated from 2,000 to 7,000 years old.

In 2012, new evidence suggested that the crater may be as young as 800 years old, although this estimation was a lower bound, and it's still possible the crater is much older than that.

Geology
The crater was formed when magma migrated close to the surface and the heat of the magma caused groundwater to flash into steam, throwing large quantities of pulverized old rock and new magma across the stony alluvial fan draped across the valley floor. The magma rose through a fault that lies along the western base of Tin Mountain. Movement on this fault was responsible for uplift of the entire Cottonwood Mountains range.

Eruptions

Geologists call the resulting large steam explosions hydrovolcanic or phreatic eruption and the pits created are known as maars. Ubehebe was the last and largest in a series of similar eruptions in the immediate area (its eruption exceeded the tensile strength of the bedrock by 10 times). Earlier eruptions created a group of much shallower maars to the south and another to the west. Little Hebe is a spatter cone that grew in the middle of one of the largest maars in the south group. The only significant deposit of lava in the volcanic field is contained in Little Hebe.

All of the maar-forming eruptions sent out fallout debris that mantled a broad area around the volcanic field (dozens of steam explosions issued from Ubehebe alone). The resulting light to dark gray cinder deposits consist of finely fragmented volcanic rock mixed with pulverized bedrock and are thickest immediately next to Ubehebe. Erosion has since re-excavated these features, exposing layers of cinder that still overlay adjacent ridges.

A type of pyroclastic flow called a base surge was sent out of Ubehebe by one of the explosions. It started after a large column of debris was thrown skyward then began to collapse. A doughnut-shaped cloud of hot ash and gas (the base surge) speed  from the base of the column while staying close to the ground, plastering the Ubehebe-facing side of all objects in the area.

Sediments

Miocene-aged mostly reddish orange-colored conglomerate makes up the exposed bedrock in Ubehebe's walls. There is also a difference in color between these seabed sediments: On the left these sediments are yellowish in hue while on the right they are orange. The reason is due to a fault that separates the two different sedimentary units; over time at least  of vertical displacement along this fault has resulted in the abutment of these two different sedimentary units. Fallout debris dip  over the fault scarp on the pre-eruption surface but have not been offset by it.

Within Ubehebe small alluvial fans have been built on the crater wall along with talus slumps from debris flows. White silt covers the crater bottom of Ubehebe and some surrounding craters.

Visiting
There are three major trails at the crater. One trail goes from the parking area to the bottom of Ubehebe, a second circumnavigates the crater rim, while a third trail leads off to Little Hebe.

Winds at the rim of Ubehebe are very strong and often gust above .

See also
Geology of the Death Valley area
Racetrack Playa

References 

Death Valley
Death Valley National Park
Volcanoes of Inyo County, California
Maars of California
Protected areas of the Mojave Desert
Volcanology
Volcanoes of California